Fjordkraft is a Norwegian power company that delivers power to end users.

Overview
The company took over the retailing function from BKK and Skagerak Energi, which along with Statkraft own the company. Power is bought on Nord Pool Spot. The power grid and production facilities are retained by the owners. The company is based in Bergen, with its other two regional offices in Sandefjord and Trondheim.

Partnerships 
ONZO, a London-based Data Science Software Company announced a 5-year partnership with Fjordkraft, in 2015.

References

Companies listed on the Oslo Stock Exchange
Electric power companies of Norway
Statkraft